is a train station located in Fushimi-ku ward, city of Kyoto, Kyoto Prefecture, Japan.

Lines
 Keihan Electric Railway
 Keihan Main Line

Adjacent stations

References

Railway stations in Kyoto